Cayor was the largest and most powerful kingdom (1549–1879) that split off from the Jolof Empire in what is now Senegal. Cayor was located in northern and central Senegal, southeast of Walo, west of the kingdom of Jolof, and north of Baol and the Kingdom of Sine.

History 
In 1549, the damel (dammeel in Wolof, often translated into European languages as "king") Dece Fu Njogu became independent from Jolof and set Cayor's capital at Mboul. The French, under governor Louis Faidherbe, annexed Cayor in 1868; Cayor re-established independence in 1871. France invaded again and annexed Cayor again in 1879, when it ceased to be a sovereign state. The kingdom was extinguished in its entirety October 6, 1886.

In addition to Cayor, the damels also ruled over the Lebou area of Cap-Vert (where modern Dakar is), and they became the "Teignes" (rulers) of the neighboring kingdom of Baol.

Traditionally the damel himself was not purely hereditary, but was designated by a 4-member council consisting of:
 the Jaudin Bul (Diawdine-Boul), hereditary chief of the Jambur ("free men"; French Diambour)
 the Calau (Tchialaw), chief of the canton of Jambanyan (Diambagnane)
 the Botal (Bôtale), chief of the canton of Jop (Diop), and
 the Baje (Badgié), chief of the canton of Gateny (Gatègne).

A great hero in Senegal history, for his defiance and battles against the French, was Lat Jor.  He was defeated at the battle of Dekheule, and was deposed twice, in 1869 and 1879.  He converted to Islam  around 1861.

The 30th and last damel of Cayor was Samba Laube Fal (1858–1886), killed at Tivaouane, Senegal.

Culture 
Cayor society was highly stratified. The damel and nobles (Garmi) were at the top of the hierarchy followed by free men (including villagers and marabouts) who were known as Jambur. Below the Jambur were the Nyenoo, members of hereditary and endogamous castes that were metalworkers, tailors, griots, woodcarvers, etc. The lowest group of the hierarchy consisted of Dyaam, or slaves. Slaves were generally treated well and those that were owned by the kingdom often exercised military and political power.

As early as the 15th century, rulers were exposed to Islamic influence. In 1445, Venetian traveler Alvise Cadamosto reported that the king's entourage included Berber and Arab clerics. Since at least the 16th century, traces of Islamic influence were felt in the kingdom and in certain rituals among the nobility. Literate marabouts settled in the area from Mali or Fouta. With the conversion of Lat Jor to Islam, the inhabitants began to quickly adopt the religion as well.

List of rulers 
Names and dates taken from John Stewart's African States and Rulers (1989).
 Detye Fu-N'diogu (1549)
 Amari Fall (1549-1593)
 Samba Fall(1593-1600)
 Khuredya Fall (1600-1610)
 Biram Manga Fall (1610-1640)
 Dauda Demba Fall (1640-1647)
 Dyor Fall (1647-1664)
 Birayma Yaasin-Bubu Fall (1664-1681)
 Detye Maram N'Galgu Fall (1681-1683)
 Faly Fall (1683-1684)
 Khuredya Kumba Fall (1684-1691)
 Birayma Mbenda-Tyilor Fall (1691-1693)
 Dyakhere Fall (1693)
 Dethialaw Fall (1693-1697)
 Lat Sukaabe Fall (1697-1719)
 Isa-Tende Fall (1719-1748)
 Isa Bige N'Gone Fall (1758-1759) (First Reign)
 Birayma Yamb Fall (1759-1760)
 Isa Bige N'Gone Fall (1760-1763) (Second Reign)
 Dyor Yaasin Isa Fall (1763-1766)
 Kodu Kumba Fall (1766-1777)
 Birayama Faatim-Penda Fall (1777-1790)
 Amari Fall (1790-1809)
 Birayama Fatma Fall (1809-1832)
 Isa Ten-Dyor Fall (1832-1855)
 Birayama-Fall (1855-1859)
 Ma-Kodu Fall (1859-May 1861)
 Ma-Dyodyo Fall (May 1861-December 1861) (First Reign)
 Lat-Dyor Diop (1862-December 1863) (First Reign)
 Ma-Dyodyo Fall (January 1864 – 1868) (Second Reign)
 Lat-Dyor Diop (1868-December 1872) (Second Reign)
 Amari Fall (January 1883-August 1883)
 Samba Fall (1883-1886)

See also
Jolof Empire
History of Senegal
Ise Bige
Lingeer Ngoné Dièye

References

Kingdoms of Senegal
Former monarchies of Africa
Countries in precolonial Africa
French West Africa
History of Senegal
States and territories established in 1549
1879 disestablishments
1549 establishments in Africa